Lysinibacillus meyeri is a Gram-positive bacterium from the genus of Lysinibacillus which has been isolated from a medical practice.

References

Bacillaceae
Bacteria described in 2013